The Irish PGA Championship, formerly the Irish Professional Championship and colloquially known as the Irish Professional Close or National Championship, is a golf tournament that is played annually in Ireland since 1907. It is one of the oldest golf tournaments in the world, the oldest in the country, and has been played at many different golf courses in Ireland.

It is the marquee event on the PGA Tour of Ireland's schedule, having many notable winners in the over 100 years of play. Christy O'Connor Snr and Harry Bradshaw have the most wins in the event with 10. The event was played in match-play format from its inauguration in 1907 until it became a stroke play event in 1910.

Winners

From 1907 to 1909 the championship was a match-play event. The final was over 18 holes in 1907 and 36 holes in 1908 and 1909. The format changed to stroke play from 1910. The tournament was reduced to 54 holes in 1967, 1979, 1985, 1998, 2002 and 2012 and to 36 holes in 1987.

Most wins

Tournament summaries

1907 Irish Professional Championship
The first Irish Professional Championship was played on 20 and 21 May 1907 at Royal Portrush Golf Club. There was an 18-hole stroke play contest on the first morning with the leading 8 qualifying for the knockout matchplay stage. James Edmundson and Harry Hamill led with scores of 76. Three players were tied for the final place and played a 9-hole playoff to decide the last place, won by Hugh McNeill. In the first round of the matchplay Edmundson and Hamill were drawn to play each other, Edmundson being the surprise winner by 5&4. The semi-finals and final were played on the second day. Local professional Edmundson and Yorkshireman Bertie Snowball won their semi-finals and met in the final. The match was all square after 9 holes but Edmundson won the next three and eventually won 2&1.

The Championship was preceded by the first professional match between Ireland and Scotland on 18 May. Teams of 12 played singles and foursomes. Ireland beat a weak Scotland team by 14 matches to 3 with 1 match halved. The players had played a 36-hole stroke-play event the previous day, won by Michael Moran with a score of 154, 4 ahead of Bertie Snowball.

1908 Irish Professional Championship
The 1908 Championship was extended to a third day, being played from 13–15 May at Portmarnock Golf Club. The first day was a 36-hole event with 8 qualifying for the matchplay stage. As in 1907 James Edmundson and Harry Hamill led, with scores of 160. Edmundson and Bertie Snowball again met in the final. In the 36-hole final Edmundson won comfortably 5&3 after being 4 up after 18 holes. Edmundson won a gold medal and the £10 first prize.

1909 Irish Professional Championship
The 1909 Championship retained the same format and was played from 12–14 May at Royal County Down Golf Club. James Edmundson was again joint leader, this time with Michael Moran, with scores of 167. In the first round Edmundson was finally defeated. Moran and Harry Kidd won their two matches and met in the final. Moran started badly and was 3 down after 6 holes. However, he then won the next 6 holes and was 2 up after the first round. Moran won the first hole in the afternoon and from the 5th to the 11th holes won 6 more to win easily 9&7, the first of five successive victories in the championship.

1910 Irish Professional Championship
From 1910 the Championship became a 72-hole strokeplay event. It was played on 9 and 10 June at Royal Dublin Golf Club. Defending champion Michael Moran, pulled 7 ahead at the end of the first day after a second round 72, a course record. On the second day Moran set another course record of 70, extending his lead to 13. A final round of 76 gave him a 10 stroke win over Michael Cahill and 23 ahead of the rest of the field.

1911 Irish Professional Championship
The 1911 Championship was played on 8 and 9 June at Royal Portrush Golf Club. Michael Moran led after the first day on 159, three ahead of James Edmundson. In the third round Edmundson scored 75 to Moran's 78 to be on level terms. Moran then scored a final round 72 to Edmundson's 78 to win by six strokes. Hugh McNeill finished third a further three shots behind.

1912 Irish Professional Championship
The 1912 Championship was played on 9 and 10 May at Castlerock Golf Club. Pat Doyle led after the first day on 152, having set a course record of 72 in his afternoon round. Michael Moran was three behind on 155. Moran scored 75 in the third round to Doyle's 82 to take a 4 stroke lead. Another 75 from Moran gave him a 6 shot win over Doyle who finished with a 77. Harry Hamill was third, a further shot behind.

1913 Irish Professional Championship
The 1913 Championship was played on 31 July and 1 August at Portmarnock Golf Club. After two rounds Hugh McNeill led on 163, ahead of Pat O'Hare on 164. Defending champion Michael Moran was tied for fifth after a second round 88. After a third round 79 O'Hare had a lead of 5 strokes from McNeill and Charlie Pope, with Moran a further shot back. McNeill and Pope faded in the final round, while O'Hare and Moran both took 39 for the front nine. O'Hare then took 7 at the 10th and 11th and came home in 44 to Moran's 36 to give Moran a two stroke victory and his fifth successive title. Pope had a final round 82 to finish third.

1914 Irish Professional Championship
In early 1914 Michael Moran left Royal Dublin Golf Club to be professional at Seaham Harbour, County Durham and so he was not eligible to defend his title in 1914. The 1914 Championship was played on 28 and 29 May at Royal County Down Golf Club. Local professional Alex Robertson led after the first day on 151 with Jimmy O'Hare a shot behind. After the third round Hugh McNeill and Charlie Pope were tied for the lead with Robertson a shot behind. In the final round Pope took 75 to McNeill's 89 to take the championship by 8 strokes from brothers Jimmy and Pat O'Hare with Robertson a further shot behind.

References

External links
Irish PGA Championship official site

Golf tournaments in Ireland
Recurring sporting events established in 1907
1907 establishments in Ireland